Andalusia, also known as the Nicholas Biddle Estate, is a historic mansion and estate located on the Delaware River, just northeast of Philadelphia, in Bensalem Township, Bucks County, Pennsylvania. The community surrounding it, Andalusia, takes its name from the 225-acre estate.

History
The original house was built in 1794 by John Craig, who named it after the Andalusia region of Spain. Craig hired architect Benjamin Latrobe to expand the house in 1806 in a Greek Revival style. In 1811, Craig's daughter Jane married prominent financier Nicholas Biddle (1786–1844). Biddle and architect Thomas U. Walter expanded the house into a mansion in 1834–36. Walter is best known for his design for the dome of the United States Capitol.

Their most dramatic addition was a two-and-a-half-story wing, surrounded on three sides by massive Doric columns, that thrust southward toward the river. This contained twin parlors on the main floor, divided by pocket doors that could be opened to create a single room. The wing ended in a portico, one that has become an icon of Greek Revival architecture. Across the north façade, a  two-story block of new rooms created a grand entrance and service spaces. Some of Latrobe's 1806 spaces were retained in the 1830s alterations, including twin rooms with semi-octagonal ends.

Notable Biddle family members include Nicholas's brother Commodore James Biddle (1783–1848), son Congressman Charles John Biddle (1819–1873), great-grandson and aviator Charles John Biddle (1890–1972), and great-great-grandson and National Trust for Historic Preservation president James "Jimmy" Biddle (1929–2005). The property remains in the Biddle family. 
 
The house was declared a National Historic Landmark in 1966. According to the National Park Service, "Andalusia is one of the earliest and most pristine examples of the Greek Revival style in the country." Today it is operated as a house museum.

References

External links

Listing at Philadelphia Architects and Buildings

National Historic Landmarks in Pennsylvania
Houses on the National Register of Historic Places in Pennsylvania
Houses completed in 1794
Museums in Bucks County, Pennsylvania
Historic house museums in Pennsylvania
Houses in Bucks County, Pennsylvania
Historic American Buildings Survey in Pennsylvania
Benjamin Henry Latrobe buildings and structures
Biddle family residences
National Register of Historic Places in Bucks County, Pennsylvania
1794 establishments in Pennsylvania
Bensalem Township, Pennsylvania